Mauro Semprini (born 15 April 1998) is an Italian professional footballer who plays as a forward for  club Taranto.

Club career
Born in Rome, Semprini finished his formation in Virtus Entella youth sector.

On 3 August 2018, he joined Serie D club Ponsacco.

On 13 July 2019, he signed with Serie C club Pontedera. Semprini made his professional debut on 24 August 2019 against Carrrarese.

On 16 August 2020, he was loaned to Südtirol. His loan ended on 16 January 2021.

He left Pontedera for the 2021–22 season. On 9 August 2021 he joined Serie C club Lucchese.

On 12 January 2023, Semprini moved to Taranto.

References

External links
 
 

1998 births
Living people
Footballers from Rome
Italian footballers
Association football forwards
Serie C players
Serie D players
Lupa Roma F.C. players
Virtus Entella players
F.C. Ponsacco 1920 S.S.D. players
U.S. Città di Pontedera players
F.C. Südtirol players
Lucchese 1905 players
Taranto F.C. 1927 players